The Southern California Intercollegiate Athletic Conference men's basketball tournament is the annual conference men's basketball championship tournament for the NCAA Division III Southern California Intercollegiate Athletic Conference (SCIAC). The tournament has been held annually since 2008. It is a single-elimination tournament and seeding is based on regular season records.

The winner, declared conference champion, receives the SCIAC's automatic bid to the NCAA Men's Division III Basketball Championship.

Results

Championship records

Caltech, La Verne, and Whittier have not appeared in the SCIAC tournament finals.

References

NCAA Division III men's basketball conference tournaments
Tournament
Recurring sporting events established in 2008